Grape ice cream is ice cream with a grape flavor. Some recipes use grape juice in its preparation. Dishes and variations include grape ice cream sandwiches and grape ice cream soda. Grape ice cream is sometimes offered at grape festivals. For example, the Naples Grape Festival has offered grape ice cream. Grape ice cream is not a commonly made flavor in the US. It is one of the more common flavors in Japan.

See also

 Ice cream float – Purple cow
 List of grape dishes
 List of ice cream flavors

References

Flavors of ice cream
Grape dishes